This is a complete list of issues in the Uncle Scrooge series of comic books, grouped by publisher and sorted in chronological order after the date of publication.

List

Dell Comics (1952–1962)

Gold Key Comics (1963–1980)

Whitman Publishing (1980–1984)

Gladstone Publishing (1986–1990)

Disney Comics (1990–1993)

Gladstone Publishing (1993–1998)

Gemstone Publishing (2003–2008)

Boom Kids! (2009–2011)

IDW Publishing (2015–2020)  
 
 
Released Jun 17, 2020 due to shutdowns from the COVID-19 pandemic in the United States. Final issue of series.

References 

 

Disney comics
Dell Comics titles
Gold Key Comics titles
Gladstone Publishing titles
Disney Comics titles
Gemstone Publishing titles
IDW Publishing titles
Comics-related lists